Elbert Lowder (born 1932; died December 14, 2006) was American checkers champion noted for dominating the "11-man ballot". He worked as a piano tuner and was from North Carolina. As one of the grandmasters who played against the Chinook program he is mentioned several times in Jonathan Schaeffer's book One Jump Ahead: Challenging Human Supremacy in Checkers. Elbert Lowder was a member of the United Methodist Church.

References 

American checkers players
Players of English draughts
Sportspeople from North Carolina
1932 births
2006 deaths

20th-century Methodists
21st-century Methodists
American United Methodists